The Firzovik Detachment of the Ottoman Empire (Turkish: Firzovik Müfrezesi) was one of the detachments under the command of the Ottoman Vardar Army of the Western Army. It was formed in Firzovik (present day: Uroševac) area during the First Balkan War.

Balkan Wars

Order of battle, October 19, 1912 
On October 19, 1912, the detachment was structured as follows:

Firzovik Detachment HQ (Serbian Front, under the command of the Vardar Army of the Western Army)
20th Division
Metroviça Redif Division

Sources

Detachment of the Ottoman Empire
Military units and formations of the Ottoman Empire in the Balkan Wars
Ottoman period in the history of Kosovo
1912 establishments in the Ottoman Empire